Alethodontus is an extinct genus of chimaera from the Hettangian stage of the Jurassic period. It is known from a single species, A. bavariensis, known from Germany.

References

Chimaeriformes
Prehistoric cartilaginous fish genera